The Spring Triangle is an astronomical asterism involving an imaginary triangle drawn upon the celestial sphere, with its defining vertices at Arcturus, Spica, and Regulus. This triangle connects the constellations of Boötes, Virgo, and Leo. It is visible rising in the south eastern sky of the northern hemisphere between March and May.

George Lovi of Sky & Telescope magazine had a slightly different Spring triangle, including the tail of Leo, Denebola, instead of Regulus. Denebola is dimmer, but the triangle is more nearly equilateral.

These stars form parts of a larger Spring asterism called the Great Diamond together with Cor Caroli.

The stars of the Spring Triangle

Arcturus (α Boötes) 
Arcturus is a giant orange star located in the constellation of Boötes. Located only 37 light-years away, it has an apparent magnitude of -0.05. It is the brightest star in the northern hemisphere and fourth brightest in the night sky. 

Due to its ability to be spotted easily, Arcturus was identified by ancient humans and tied to mythological ideals. The star was given its name from the ancient Greek Ἀρκτοῦρος (Arktouros), which translates to "Guardian of the Bear." This name was selected because of the stars proximity to Ursa Major and Ursa Minor, surmising the two bear constellations were guarded by Arcturus.

Arcturus is thought to be around 6 to 8.5 billion years old, and has traveled up the red-giant branch of the Hertzsprung-Russell diagram, where it has expanded in size. The star is has a diameter of around 36 million km, making it around 26 times larger than the Sun. Despite this size difference, the mass of Arcturus is only 1.1 times that of the Sun. 

With a high speed of 122 km/s (or 270,000 mph) and movement not in the galactic plane most other stars move on, it is thought that Arcturus could have formed outside of the Milky Way. This star is the namesake of a group of 52 other stars which share this similar proper motion, named the Arcturus moving group or Arcturus stream. It has been proposed that these stars are remnants of an ancient dwarf satellite galaxy that was assimilated into the Milky Way long ago.

Spica (α Virginis) 
Spica is a binary blue-white star pair that appears as a single point of light from Earth, so it is commonly referred to as a single star. The star system is 262 light-years away and has an apparent magnitude of 1.04. It is the brightest star in the constellation Virgo, and is the 15th brightest star in the night sky. 

The name Spica is derived from a Latin phrase that describes the zodiac sign Virgo as holding an ear of grain, spīca virginis. Virgo the Maiden is often represented as a young woman holding this stalk of grain. The best times of the year to view this star are during early spring to late summer in the northern hemisphere. To easily find this star, locate the Big Dipper and follow the curve of the handle. Following this path will first lead you to Arcturus. Finally, "drive a spike"  directly to Spica.

Spica is made up of two individual stars, Spica A and Spica B, with radii of 7.40 and 3.64 times the radius of the Sun, respectfully. These sizes are large contributors to the brightness of the stars. Spica A has a luminosity of 12,100 that of our sun, while Spica B has a luminosity of 1,500. Their size also leads to surface temperatures of 22,400 K and 18,500 K, much higher than the Sun. The stars have a small distance of only 0.12 AU, and an orbital period of only four days. This proximity gives gravity the effect of distorting both stars into being egg-shaped, where the pointed ends face the other star.

See also
Summer Triangle
Winter Triangle
Northern Cross

External links 

 Lions in the Sky and other Spring Treasures 
 The Spring Triangle Shows Denebola instead of Regulus in the spring triangle

Asterisms (astronomy)